The 1947 Arizona State–Flagstaff Lumberjacks football team was an American football team that represented Arizona State College at Flagstaff (now known as Northern Arizona University) in the Border Conference during the 1947 college football season. In its first year under head coach Nick Ragus, the team compiled a 1–7 record (0–4 against conference opponents) and was outscored by a total of 295 to 39.  The team played its three home games at Skidmore Field in Flagstaff, Arizona.

Schedule

References

Arizona State-Flagstaff
Northern Arizona Lumberjacks football seasons
Arizona State-Flagstaff Lumberjacks football